Amraica is a genus of moths in the family Geometridae.

Species
 Amraica debrunnescens (Prout, 1926)
 Amraica ponderata Felder
 Amraica praeparva Prout
 Amraica recursaria (Walker, 1860)
 Amraica solivagaria (Walker, 1866)
 Amraica superans (Butler, 1878)

References
 Amraica at Markku Savela's Lepidoptera and some other life forms

Boarmiini
Geometridae genera